Feel the Noise is a 2007 American drama film written by Albert Leon, directed by Alejandro Chomski and produced by Jennifer Lopez. It was released on October 5, 2007 and stars Omarion, Giancarlo Esposito, Victor Rasuk and James McCaffrey.

Plot
After a run-in with local thugs to raise money for a chance at a record deal, a Harlem born aspiring rapper of an African American mother and Puerto Rican father, Rob (Omarion) flees to Puerto Rico, seeks refuge with a Puerto Rican father (Giancarlo Esposito) he never knew, and finds his salvation in Reggaeton, a spicy blend of hip-hop, reggae and Latin beats. Puerto Rico, the spiritual home of Reggaeton, inspires Rob and his step-brother Javi (Victor Rasuk) to pursue their dream of becoming Reggaeton stars. Together with a dancer named C.C., they learn what it means to stay true to themselves and each other, while overcoming obstacles in love, greed and pride, all culminating in an explosive performance at New York's Puerto Rican Day Parade.

Cast
Omarion as Rob
Giancarlo Esposito as Roberto
Victor Rasuk as Javi
Zulay Henao as Carol "CC" Reyes
James McCaffrey as Jeffrey Skyler
Melonie Diaz as Mimi
Meredith Ostrom as Noelia
Rosa Arredondo as Marivi
Alexis Garcia as Peter
Notch as himself
Pras as Electric
Charles Duckworth as Nodde
Cisco Reyes as Pito
Kellita Smith as Tanya
Malik Yoba as The Mayor
Jerome Jones as himself
Vico C as himself
Voltio as himself
Jennifer Lopez as herself

Critical reception
As of October 17, 2007 on Metacritic, the film had an average score of 36 out of 100, based on 9 reviews. It has a 13% rotten rating on Rotten Tomatoes.

At the U.S. box office, since its release it has grossed $5,898,393, and $552,713 from foreign markets.

References

External links
Feel the Noise - Official site

2007 films
Puerto Rico in fiction
2000s musical drama films
American dance films
American musical drama films
Films directed by Alejandro Chomski
2000s hip hop films
Hood films
Nuyorican Productions films
TriStar Pictures films
2007 drama films
2000s English-language films
2000s American films